Carlos Alberto Mayor (born 5 October 1965 in Buenos Aires, Argentina) is an Argentine former footballer who played as a defender.

Club statistics

Managerial statistics

References

External links
 
 
 
 
 Carlos Mayor at Footballdatabase

1965 births
Living people
Argentine footballers
Argentine expatriate footballers
Club de Gimnasia y Esgrima La Plata footballers
Argentinos Juniors footballers
Unión de Santa Fe footballers
Deportivo Español footballers
All Boys footballers
Deportes Iquique footballers
J1 League players
Japan Football League (1992–1998) players
Avispa Fukuoka players
Chilean Primera División players
Argentine Primera División players
Expatriate footballers in Chile
Expatriate footballers in Japan
Footballers at the 1988 Summer Olympics
Argentina international footballers
Argentine football managers
J2 League managers
Renofa Yamaguchi FC managers
Association football defenders
Olympic footballers of Argentina
Footballers from Buenos Aires